Oberlungwitz is a town in the Zwickau district, in Saxony, Germany. It is situated 18 km northeast of Zwickau, and 15 km west of Chemnitz.

References 

Zwickau (district)